

Films

References

LGBT
1978 in LGBT history
1978
1978